Paulo Bento is a municipality in the state of Rio Grande do Sul, Brazil.

References 

Municipalities in Rio Grande do Sul